Title 4 of the United States Code outlines the role of flag of the United States, Great Seal of the United States, Washington, DC, and the states in the United States Code.

Chapter 1

  — Flag; stripes and stars on
  — Same; additional stars
  — Use of flag for advertising purposes; mutilation of flag
  — Pledge of allegiance to the flag; manner of delivery
  — Display and use of flag by civilians; codification of rules and customs; definition
  — Time and occasions for display
  — Position and manner of display
  — Respect for flag
  — Conduct during hoisting, lowering or passing of flag
  — Modification of rules and customs by President

Note that  is where Flag Day is codified.

Chapter 2

  — Seal of the United States
  — Same; custody and use of

Chapter 3

  — Permanent seat of Government
  — Public offices; at seat of Government
  — Same; removal from seat of Government

Chapter 4

  — Oath by members of legislatures and officers
  — Same; by whom administered
  — Assent to purchase of lands for forts
  — Tax on motor fuel sold on military or other reservation
  — State, and so forth, taxation affecting Federal areas; sales or use tax
  — Same; income tax
  — Same; exception of United States, its instrumentalities, and authorized purchases
  — Same; jurisdiction of United States over Federal areas unaffected
  — Same; exception of Indians
  — Same; definitions
  — Same; taxation affecting Federal employees; income tax
  — Compacts between States for cooperation in prevention of crime; consent of Congress
  — Residence of Members of Congress for State income tax laws
  — Limitation on State income taxation of certain pension income
  — Limitation on State authority to tax compensation paid to individuals performing services at Fort Campbell, Kentucky
  — Rules for determining State and local government treatment of charges related to mobile telecommunications services
  — Sourcing rules
  — Limitations
  — Electronic databases for nationwide standard numeric jurisdictional codes
  — Procedure if no electronic database provided
  — Correction of erroneous data for place of primary use
  — Determination of place of primary use
  — Scope; special rules
  — Definitions
  — Nonseverability
  — No inference

Chapter 5

  — Collection, preparation and publication
  — Appointment of experts
  — Employment and utilization of other personnel; cost of copy reading and indexing
  — Cooperation of departments and agencies
  — Printing and distribution
  — Authorization of appropriations

References

External links
U.S. Code Title 4, via United States Government Printing Office
U.S. Code Title 4, via Cornell University

 
04